Teuku Mohammad Hamzah Thayeb (born 31 May 1952) is an Indonesian diplomat. He was Ambassador of Indonesia to Australia between 2005 and 2008 and Ambassador of Indonesia to the UK between 2011 and 2015.

Life and career 
Born on 31 May 1952 in Paris, France, Hamzah was educated at Jayabaya University in West Java. He started his career as a public relations officer at the national secretariat of ASEAN in 1975.

From 2005 to 2008, Hamzah was Ambassador of Indonesia to Australia. In March 2006, Hamzah faced protests from Papuan and refugee activists over the West Papuan refugee crisis. The Indonesian Government guaranteed the Papuan's safety and Hamzah said he did not understand why the West Papuans had sought asylum to begin with. Hamzah was temporarily recalled to Indonesia when the Australian Government granted the Papuans asylum. He arrived back in Canberra in June 2006.

In 2012, he was part of the State visit of President Susilo Bambang Yudhoyono to the United Kingdom. He was appointed an Honorary Knight Commander of the Royal Victorian Order. In 2013, Hamzah was named 'Diplomat of the Year from Asia 2013' by The Diplomat, whilst serving as Indonesian Ambassador to the United Kingdom and Ireland. His father Hadi Thayeb had also been the Indonesian ambassador to the UK and Ireland, in the early 1990s.

References 

Indonesian diplomats
Living people
1952 births
Ambassadors of Indonesia to Australia
Acehnese people
Indonesian Muslims
Ambassadors of Indonesia to the United Kingdom
Honorary Knights Commander of the Royal Victorian Order